Bassingthwaighte is a surname. Some notable people with this surname include:
 Carmen Bassingthwaighte (born 1986), Namibian professional racing cyclist
 Marc Bassingthwaighte (born 1983), Namibian cyclist 
 Natalie Bassingthwaighte (born 1975),  Australian recording artist, actress, and television personality
 Michael Bassingthwaighte DSM, Australian army officer who commanded Operation Okra Task Group Taji in the second half of 2019, received Distinguished Service Medal in the 2009 Australia Day Honours
 Sarah Bassingthwaighte, American flautist